Matan Kahana (born 29 July 1972) is an Israeli politician who served as deputy Minister of Religious Services and as a member of Knesset for New Right and Yamina. He was an officer in the IDF with the rank of colonel, who served as a fighter in Sayeret Matkal, and as a fighter pilot in the Israeli Air Force. He was a commander of a squadron of F-16s. After retiring from the army, he joined the New Right party, which is part of the Yamina alliance. In 2022 he joined the National Unity alliance.

Biography
Kahana was born in Haifa.

When he was three months old, he moved with his family to New York, USA, following his father's electrical engineering and business administration studies. When he was three, the family returned to live in Moshav Beit Gamliel. Kahana attended elementary school at Kibbutz Hafetz Haim (grades 1-8), and then at the Netiv Meir Yeshiva. In his youth, he was a counselor in the Bnei Akiva movement, in the branch in Moshav Beit Gamliel.

He graduated with a BA in Law at Bar-Ilan University.

Kahana is married to Lisa, a Doctor of Clinical Psychology, and is the father of four children. He lives in the religious moshav Beit Gamliel.

Military career

Kahana was drafted into the flying course, but signed a waiver to serve in Sayeret Matkal. He served as a fighter for three and a half years. In January 1994, when he finished his mandatory service, he joined a fighter pilot course, and served as a fighter pilot in 116 Squadron.

Throughout his service, he participated as a pilot in Cast Lead, Operation Pillar of Defense, and the 2014 Gaza War. He also participated as an F-16 pilot in the Second Lebanon War.

Upon completion of his position as commander of the Valley Squadron, he was promoted to the rank of lieutenant colonel and appointed the head of the division at the Air Force headquarters. In August 2018, he was released from the IDF.

Political career
After his release from the IDF in 2018, Kahana served as director of the Diaspora Initiative at the Center for Educational Technology.

On 10 January 2019, he announced that he was joining the New Right party, led by Naftali Bennett and Ayelet Shaked. He placed fourth on the Knesset party list for the April 2019 Knesset elections, but was not elected to the Knesset after his party narrowly failed to pass the election threshold.

Ahead of the September 2019 elections, he was listed seventh on the Yamina joint party list (on behalf of the New Right). The list won seven seats, and he was elected to the 22nd Knesset.

In May 2022, he resigned from his post of the Religious Services Minister and stated he would return to the Knesset to serve as a Yamina MK, replacing MK Yomtob Kalfon. The move was meant to “help strengthen the coalition.” Following his resignation, Kahana was quickly made the Deputy Religious Services Minister while the coalition government attempted to have him appointed back to his former post through a vote in the Knesset. This was however scuttled by rebel Yamina MK Idit Silman, who voted with the opposition.

In August 2022, Kahana decided to leave Yamina for the National Unity alliance. Kahana's term as the Deputy Religious Services Minister came to an end on 16 August, when the legal mandate for Bennett, who was serving as the acting minister of the department, came to an end after three months.

References

External links

1972 births
Living people
Bar-Ilan University alumni
Israeli Air Force personnel
Israeli colonels
Israeli Orthodox Jews
Israeli soldiers
Jewish Israeli politicians
Members of the 22nd Knesset (2019–2020)
Members of the 23rd Knesset (2020–2021)
Members of the 24th Knesset (2021–2022)
Members of the 25th Knesset (2022–)
Government ministers of Israel
Ministers of Religious affairs of Israel
New Right (Israel) politicians
People from Haifa
Yamina politicians
Israeli expatriates in the United States